This article show all participating team squads at the Women's Olympic Volleyball Tournament at the 1992 Summer Olympics in Barcelona, Spain.

Brazil

Head Coach: Wadson Lima

China

Head Coach: Hu Jin

Cuba

Head Coach: Eugenio George Lafita

Japan

Head Coach: Kazunori Yoneda

Netherlands

Head Coach: Peter Murphy

Spain

Head Coach: Jaime Fernández Barros

Unified Team

Head Coach: Nikolay Karpol

United States

Head Coach: Terry Liskevych

References

External links
FIVB Line-ups

1992
2
1992 in women's volleyball